Lawrencia Ann "Bambi" Bembenek (August 15, 1958 – November 20, 2010), known as Laurie Bembenek, was an American former police officer, convicted for the 1981 murder of her husband's ex-wife. Her story garnered national attention in 1990 after Bembenek escaped from Taycheedah Correctional Institution in Wisconsin and was recaptured in Thunder Bay, Ontario, an episode that inspired books, movies and the slogan "Run, Bambi, Run". Upon winning a new trial, Bembenek pleaded no contest to second-degree murder and was sentenced to time served and 10 years' probation in December 1992. For years, she sought to have the sentence overturned.

Prior to her arrest, Bembenek was fired by the Milwaukee Police Department and had gone on to sue the department, claiming that it engaged in sexual discrimination and other illegal activities. She worked briefly as a waitress at the Lake Geneva, Wisconsin, Playboy Club. At the time of her arrest, she was working for Marquette University's Public Safety Department in downtown Milwaukee. On November 20, 2010, Bembenek died at a hospice facility in Portland, Oregon at age 52.

Early life
Lawrencia Ann Bembenek was the youngest of three girls born to Joseph and Virginia Bembenek in Milwaukee on August 15, 1958. Joseph had previously worked for the Milwaukee Police Department but quit after witnessing what he described as corruption within the department. He later worked as a carpenter.

Bembenek, raised Catholic, attended St. Augustine Elementary School and St. Mary's Academy in Milwaukee. She later transferred to Bay View High School, where she graduated in 1976. Upon graduation, Bembenek attended  Bryant & Stratton College in Virginia Beach, Virginia, where she earned an associate degree in fashion merchandising management.

Career and marriage
After college, Bembenek worked in retail and had a brief stint as a model. In 1978, she appeared as "Miss March" in a calendar distributed by the Joseph Schlitz Brewing Company.

In March 1980, Bembenek began training at the Milwaukee Police Academy. While still a trainee, an anonymous tipster reported that she was seen smoking marijuana at a party. Bembenek denied the charge, which was investigated but never substantiated. Bembenek later said she believed the accusation was made by the wife of a Milwaukee police officer who confronted her at a party about her clothing and accused Bembenek of leading on her husband. Bembenek graduated from the Academy in the summer of 1980 and was assigned to the MPD's South Side Second District.

In her autobiography Woman on the Run, Bembenek claimed that the MPD was then composed of "brutal, lazy, apathetic and corrupt" police officers. She also claimed that female and minority officers routinely were subjected to harassment and abuse during training. Bembenek stated that when female and minority trainees became members of the MPD, they often were punished or fired for minor infractions during their probationary period while white male officers went unpunished for more serious offenses.

While training at the Academy, Bembenek met and became close with another female trainee, Judy Zess. At a rock concert in May 1980, Zess was arrested for smoking marijuana. Bembenek's subsequent dismissal from the MPD on August 25 stemmed from her involvement in filing a false report on Zess' arrest. After being fired, Bembenek discovered scandalous photos of several MPD officers, including her future husband, Elfred O. "Fred" Schultz, dancing nude on picnic tables in Gordon Park near one of their favorite hangouts, The Tracks tavern. She took the pictures to the Equal Employment Opportunity Commission arguing that while she was fired for a minor infraction, the photos proved that other police officers committing more serious violations were not punished. The EEOC encouraged Bembenek to file a discrimination report with the MPD's internal affairs division. In the months following her firing, Bembenek briefly worked as a waitress at the Playboy Club in Lake Geneva, Wisconsin.

Around that time, Bembenek met Schultz, then a 13-year veteran of the MPD. Schultz had two sons and had obtained a divorce from his first wife, Christine, in November 1980. Bembenek and Schultz were married in January 1981 in Waukegan, Illinois. At the time of the marriage, Bembenek was working as a personal trainer at a health club and was living in an apartment with Schultz, her friend Judy Zess, and Zess' boyfriend Thomas D. Gaertner. Bembenek later got a job as a campus security officer at Marquette University in Milwaukee.

In November 1981, Bembenek and Schultz were remarried after a judge ruled that the couple's marriage was invalid, stating that Schultz had violated Wisconsin law by not waiting six months after his divorce from Christine to remarry.

Murder of Christine Schultz
On May 28, 1981, at approximately 2:15am, Schultz's ex-wife Christine was murdered in her Milwaukee home. She had been shot point blank into her back through her heart by a single shot from a .38 caliber pistol. Christine had been gagged and blindfolded, and her hands were tied in front of her with rope. Her two sons, then 7 and 11 years old, found her face down on her bed and bleeding. The older boy, Sean, had seen the assailant and described him as a masked male figure in a green army jacket and black shoes. He also said the man had a long (approx. 6" or 15 cm) reddish-colored ponytail.

At the time of her murder, Christine and Fred Schultz had been divorced six months. Schultz initially stated he was on duty investigating a burglary with his partner, Michael Durfee, at the time of the murder, but years later admitted they were actually drinking at a local bar. When ballistics testing allegedly revealed it was his off-duty revolver that had been the murder weapon, suspicion shifted to Bembenek, as she had been alone in the apartment she shared with Schultz and had access to both the gun and a key to Christine's house that he had secretly copied from his oldest son's house key. Bembenek was arrested for Christine Schultz's murder on June 24, 1981.

Schultz had previously been exonerated in the fatal shooting of a Glendale, Wisconsin police officer on July 23, 1975. The Glendale officer, George Robert Sassan, had arrested a subject in a bar while off-duty. Milwaukee police officers, including Schultz, responded to the call in suburban Glendale (outside their jurisdiction), reportedly mistook Sassan for a suspect and shot him to death when he turned toward them, holding a gun. Schultz and his partner were cleared by the Milwaukee County District Attorney's Office in the shooting.

Trial and conviction
Bembenek's trial generated tremendous publicity, and newspapers began referring to her as "Bambi" Bembenek (a nickname she disliked). The prosecution portrayed Bembenek as a loose woman addicted to expensive living who wanted Christine Schultz dead so that her new husband would no longer have to pay alimony. Pointing out that Bembenek had financial problems, the prosecution claimed that she was the only person with the motive, means and opportunity to carry out the crime. The gun used to kill Christine was Bembenek's husband's off-duty revolver, which the prosecution claimed Bembenek was the only person besides Schultz who had access to; blood was found on the gun. Bembenek supposedly also had access to a key to Christine's home. There were no signs of a break-in and no valuables taken. The strongest evidence, however, was two human hairs found at the crime scene which matched ones taken from the hairbrush of the defendant. Schultz's eldest son, however, stated that Bembenek was not the person who had held up their house and shot his mother.

Witnesses testified that Bembenek had spoken often of killing Christine. The prosecution produced a witness who said Bembenek offered to pay him to carry out the murder. According to witnesses for the prosecution, Bembenek owned a green jogging suit similar to the one described by Schultz's son. It was pointed out that she owned a clothes line and a blue bandanna similar to what was used to bind and gag the victim. A wig found in the plumbing system of Bembenek's apartment matched fibers found at the murder scene. A boutique employee testified that Bembenek purchased such a wig shortly before the murder.

On March 9, 1982, Bembenek was found guilty of first-degree murder and sentenced to life in prison. She was imprisoned at the Taycheedah Correctional Institution in Fond du Lac, Wisconsin.

Post-trial publicity
On June 28, 1983, Bembenek filed for divorce from Schultz. In an interview she gave to The Milwaukee Sentinel, Bembenek said that Schultz had written her a letter informing her that he was living with a 19-year-old woman in Florida and had decided to end their marriage. Their divorce was granted on June 19, 1984. While Schultz had initially stood by Bembenek and believed she was innocent, he later changed his mind and publicly stated that he believed she was, "Guilty as sin." Bembenek in turn came to believe that Schultz was guilty of hiring someone to murder Christine and allowed her to take the fall.

Bembenek claimed that the real murderer was Freddy Horenberger. He, along with an accomplice, had been questioned nearby days before the murder by a deputy with the Milwaukee County Sheriff's Office. Horenberger had briefly worked with Schultz on a remodeling project and was a former boyfriend of Judy Zess. A disguised Horenberger had robbed and beaten Zess several weeks prior to Christine's murder and would later serve a ten-year sentence for that crime. Bembenek contended that the attorney whom Schultz had hired to represent her had a conflict of interest and purposely failed to inform the jury that there was evidence that Schultz was connected to the murder.

After her imprisonment, Bembenek filed three unsuccessful appeals of her conviction, citing police errors in handling of key evidence and the fact that one of the prosecution's witnesses, Judy Zess, had recanted her testimony, stating it was made under duress. Bembenek and her supporters also alleged that the MPD may have singled her out for prosecution because of her role as a key witness in a federal investigation into police corruption. Bembenek's supporters suggested that Schultz may have arranged to have someone else, possibly Horenberger, murder his ex-wife.

According to a number of affidavits which emerged following Bembenek's conviction, Horenberger boasted of killing Christine to other inmates while he was in jail. Horenberger publicly denied any involvement in the murder until his alleged suicide in November 1991, following a robbery and hostage situation in which he had been involved.

There were questions raised as to the accuracy of the information and the evidence used in the trial. Dr. Elaine Samuels, the medical examiner who conducted the autopsy, had originally concluded that hairs recovered from Christine's body were consistent with that of Christine; after Dr. Samuels had come to that conclusion, the hair evidence was examined by Diane Hanson, a hair analyst from a crime lab in Madison, Wisconsin, who stated that two of the hairs were consistent with samples taken from Bembenek's hairbrush. Dr. Samuels refuted that claim, stating in a 1983 letter, quoted in the Toronto Star in 1991, that "I recovered no blonde or red hairs of any length or texture...[A]ll of the hairs I recovered from the body were brown and were grossly identical to the hair of the victim...[I] do not like to suggest that evidence was altered in any way, but I can find no logical explanation for what amounted to the appearance of blonde hair in an envelope that contained no such hair at the time it was sealed by me."

The apartment where Bembenek and Schultz lived shared drainage with another apartment. In the shared drainpipe was found a brownish-red wig which matched some of the hairs found on the victim's body. The woman who occupied the other apartment testified that Zess had knocked on her door and asked to use her bathroom; after Zess used the woman's bathroom, the plumbing was clogged. Zess had also admitted to owning a brownish-red wig.

While in prison, Bembenek earned a bachelor's degree from the University of Wisconsin–Parkside and helped found a prisoners' newspaper. She also met and became engaged to factory worker Dominic Guglietti, who was the brother of Bembenek's cellmate.

Escape and capture
On July 15, 1990, Bembenek escaped through a laundry room window and was picked up by Gugliatto. The couple were spotted two days after Bembenek's escape in Gugliatto’s truck in Wauwatosa, Wisconsin. The abandoned truck was later found in a parking lot of a Target. Bembenek and Gugliatto fled to Thunder Bay, Ontario while sensational stories about their relationship swirled through American tabloids. Her escape also reignited publicity surrounding her case, and she became something of a folk hero. A song was written about her, and T-shirts were sold with the slogan "Run, Bambi, Run".

While on the run, Bembenek used the name "Jennifer Gazzana" and got a job working as a waitress. She also worked as a fitness instructor.

On October 17, 1990, the couple were arrested after a tourist saw a segment about Bembenek's escape on America's Most Wanted. Gugliatto was deported back to the United States a month later and was eventually sentenced to one year in prison for his role in the escape. Bembenek, however, sought refugee status in Canada, claiming that she was being persecuted by a conspiracy between the police department and the judicial system in Wisconsin. The Canadian government showed some sympathy for her case, and before returning her to Wisconsin, obtained a commitment that Milwaukee officials would conduct a judicial review of her case. The review did not find evidence of crimes by police or prosecutors, but detailed seven major police blunders which had occurred during the Christine Schultz murder investigation, and she won the right to a new trial.

Bembenek voluntarily returned to the United States on April 22, 1991. Rather than risk a second conviction, however, Bembenek pleaded no contest to second-degree murder during a hearing held on December 9, 1992. She was sentenced to 20 years which was commuted to time served. She was released from custody three hours after the hearing having served a little over ten years.

Life after prison
Bembenek wrote a book about her experience, titled Woman on Trial. After her release, she had various legal and personal problems. She was arrested again on possession of marijuana and filed for bankruptcy as well as developed hepatitis C and other health problems. She also admitted to being an alcoholic. She legally changed her name to Laurie Bembenek in July 1994.

In 1996, she moved to Washington state to be near her retired parents in Vancouver. There she met U.S. Forest Service employee Marty Carson, whom she eventually married in 2005.

Bembenek was diagnosed with post-traumatic stress disorder, complicated by a growing addiction to alcohol. As a form of therapy, Carson encouraged her to devote time to her passion of painting. Bembenek had made paintings since childhood, and her early work had been the subject of an exhibition at University of Wisconsin–Milwaukee in 1992. Carson constructed a studio for her, and she eagerly returned to her art. After several years she had amassed about 30 paintings, which she put on display at a local art gallery. The gallery burned down in a fire and all the paintings were destroyed.

In 2002, Bembenek either fell or jumped from a second-story window, breaking her leg so badly that it had to be amputated below the knee. Bembenek claimed that she had been confined in an apartment by handlers for the Dr. Phil television show and was injured while attempting to escape.

Bembenek continued to insist she was innocent, but the Wisconsin Supreme Court refused to overturn her no contest plea, saying such a plea cannot be withdrawn. In April 2008, Bembenek filed a petition with the United States Supreme Court, seeking a reversal of the second murder conviction. Bembenek's attorney pointed to evidence not heard in the original trial, including ballistics tests matching the murder bullets to the gun owned by Fred Schultz, male DNA found on the victim, evidence the victim had been sexually assaulted and the eyewitness testimony of the two young sons who said they had seen a heavyset, masked man. Bembenek's petition argued the court needed to clarify whether defendants who plead guilty or no contest have an opportunity to review evidence comparable to the rights of those who plead not guilty. Her appeal was denied in June 2008.

Her case was the inspiration for two television movies and various books and articles portraying her as the victim of a miscarriage of justice. In 2004, MSNBC produced and aired a biography of Laurie Bembenek on their Headliners and Legends television show. Bembenek did not take part in the show. She was interviewed by WTMJ-TV anchor Mike Jacobs for a two-part interview that aired on that station's 10pm newscast on October 28 and 29, 2010. In April 2022, Apple Podcasts and Campside Media released the podcast series "Run, Bambi, Run," hosted by Vanessa Grigoriadis.

Death
On November 20, 2010, she died at a hospice facility in Portland, Oregon from liver and kidney failure.

Television media about Bembenek
 Calendar Girl, Cop, Killer? The Bambi Bembenek Story (1992) starring Lindsay Frost.
 City Confidential Milwaukee: The Legend of Bambi Bembenek (Season 6,  Episode 1 original air date on A&E Network 03/27/2002)
 Woman on the Run: The Lawrencia Bembenek Story (1993) starring Tatum O'Neal.
 The Perfect Murder: Deadly Divorce (2015) original air date 07/01/15 on Investigation Discovery (ID).
 On the Case with Paula Zahn: Bambi Is Captured on Investigation Discovery.
 Vanity Fair Confidential: Was Bambi Framed? original air date 02/19/2018 on Investigation Discovery.

References

Bibliography

External links
Article from Fox News about her 2002 fall and leg amputation

1958 births
2010 deaths
20th-century American criminals
American amputees
American autobiographers
American escapees
American female murderers
American police officers convicted of murder
American women non-fiction writers
American women police officers
Bay View High School alumni
Bryant and Stratton College alumni
Criminals from Portland, Oregon
Criminals from Wisconsin
Deaths from liver failure
Deaths from kidney failure
Escapees from Wisconsin detention
Fugitives
Milwaukee Police Department officers
People from Milwaukee
People convicted of murder by Wisconsin
University of Wisconsin–Parkside alumni
Women autobiographers
Writers from Wisconsin
20th-century American women
21st-century American women